Doris bovena is a species of sea slug, a dorid nudibranch, a marine gastropod mollusk in the family Dorididae.

Distribution
This species was described from the Island of São Sebastiao, São Paulo, Brazil.

References

Dorididae
Gastropods described in 1955